Watts Building in Birmingham, Alabama, is an Art Deco building built in 1927.  It was listed on the National Register of Historic Places (NRHP) in 1979.

References

National Register of Historic Places in Birmingham, Alabama
Office buildings completed in 1927
Art Deco architecture in Alabama